The conopid genus Stylogaster is a group of unusual flies. It is the only genus in the subfamily Stylogastrinae, which some authorities have historically treated as a separate family Stylogastridae (or Stylogasteridae).

Biology
Stylogastrines are obligate associates of Cockroaches, Orthoptera, some Diptera and ants.

These flies typically use army ants' raiding columns to flush out their prey, ground-dwelling Orthoptera and/or roaches. Stylogastrines are somewhat atypical for conopids, in that the egg itself is shaped somewhat like a harpoon, with a rigid barbed tip, and the egg is forcibly jabbed into the host. The female of some species waits for army ants to flush out a target, then she dives in and jabs an egg into the host. The Stylogaster larvae then develop as endoparasitoids. This is a remarkably high-risk behavior, in that many hosts are captured and killed by the ants after a female has laid an egg in it, so many eggs are lost.

Adults can occasionally be found at flowers, feeding on nectar with their proboscis, which is longer than the body when unfolded. The female's abdomen is also folded under the body, and is the derivation of the generic name (Stylogaster = "needle-tail").

Distribution
Stylogastrines can be found from the Neotropics to Canada, South America, Africa south of the Sahara, and parts of Southern Asia, including the Philippines and New Guinea.

Selected species
Stylogaster biannulata (Say, 1823)
Stylogaster camrasi Stuckenberg, 1963
Stylogaster ctenitarsa Camras & Parrillo, 1996
Stylogaster malgachensis Camras, 1962
Stylogaster neglecta Williston, 1883
Stylogaster pauliani Curran, 1962
Stylogaster rafaeli Camras & Parrillo, 1996
Stylogaster seguyi Camras, 1962
Stylogaster seyrigi Séguy, 1932
Stylogaster sinaloae Camras, 1989
Stylogaster smithiana Lopes, 1971
Stylogaster souzai Monteiro, 1960
Stylogaster souzalopesi Camras, 1990

References

Stuke, J.-H. 2012. A revision of Afrotropical species of Stylogaster Macquart (Diptera: Conopidae), with descriptions of twenty-one new species and an identification key. African Invertebrates 53 (1): 267-354.

External links
 Images at Consortium for the Barcode of Life.

Conopidae
Conopoidea genera
Taxa named by Pierre-Justin-Marie Macquart